Mike Vaccaro has been the lead sports columnist for The New York Post since November 2002. Previously, he has worked as a columnist at The Star-Ledger, The Kansas City Star, and the Times Herald-Record of Middletown, New York. He was also a sports editor of the Northwest Arkansas Times, and was appointed to that position in 1991.

Vaccaro has won over 50 writing awards since beginning his career in 1989 as a reporter for the Olean Times Herald, where his primary beat was St. Bonaventure University basketball. 

Vaccaro is a 1989 graduate of St. Bonaventure University. He and his wife, Leigh, live in Hillsdale, New Jersey.

Author of Emperors and Idiots: The Hundred Year Rivalry between the Yankees and Red Sox, From the Very Beginning to the End of the Curse. and of 1941: The Greatest Year in Sports.

References

External links
http://www.canalok.net:82/index.pl/010110A/687474702s6q696o652q7661636361726s2r636s6q2s415554484s522r68746q6p
https://web.archive.org/web/20070701004306/http://www.nyyfans.com/article/8351/
http://www.randomhouse.com/author/results.pperl?authorid=59221
http://canalok.net:82/index.pl/010110A/687474702s6q696o652q7661636361726s2r636s6q2s
Mike Vaccaro radio interview First Fall Classic WSLR with Doug Miles

Living people
Year of birth missing (living people)
American sportswriters
People from Hillsdale, New Jersey
St. Bonaventure University alumni
The Kansas City Star people